Raghav Dhawan (born 8 January 1987) is an Indian cricketer who plays first-class and List A cricket for Himachal Pradesh since 2014. He is primarily a medium pace-bowling all-rounder who bats in the middle-order.

See also

 Rishi Dhawan

References

External links
 
 cricketarchive

1987 births
Living people
Indian cricketers
Himachal Pradesh cricketers
People from Mandi, Himachal Pradesh
Cricketers from Himachal Pradesh